The AEG C.II was a German two-seat biplane reconnaissance aircraft produced in small numbers from October 1915. It was a slightly smaller version of the C.I with better performance, redesigned cockpit for both pilot and observer/bombardier, new rear mounting for a 7.92 mm (.312 in) Parabellum MG14 machine gun, and the ability to carry four 10 kg (22 lb) bombs for light attack duties.

Only one C.II was shown in German front inventory, on 30 April 1916.

Operators

Luftstreitkräfte

Specifications (AEG C.II)

References

Further reading

 Kroschel, Günter; Stützer, Helmut: Die deutschen Militärflugzeuge 1910–18, Wilhelmshaven 1977
 Munson, Kenneth: Bomber 1914–19, Zürich 1968, Nr. 20
 Nowarra, Heinz: Die Entwicklung der Flugzeuge 1914–18, München 1959
 Sharpe, Michael: Doppeldecker, Dreifachdecker & Wasserflugzeuge, Gondrom, Bindlach 2001, 

1910s German military reconnaissance aircraft
C.II
Single-engined tractor aircraft
Biplanes
Aircraft first flown in 1915